Paul Adamu Galumje (born April 21, 1950, in Taraba State) is a Nigerian jurist and Justice of the Supreme Court of Nigeria.

References 

1950 births
Living people
People from Taraba State
Nigerian jurists
Supreme Court of Nigeria justices